The Pano (Odia:ପାଣ) (also known as Pan, Buna Pana, Desua Pana) are a Dalit community of Odisha. They are recognized as Scheduled Caste in Bihar, West Bengal and Jharkhand officially. They speak Odia.

Demographics
The Buna Pano are a part of the Pano. According to the 2011 Census, 1,205,099 people in Odisha constituting 17.7% of the total SC population, were members of this caste. It was the most populous of the scheduled castes of Odisha. The Pano have the maximum population in Jajpur district, followed by Kendujhar district and Dhenkanal district, but they constitute the highest proportion (77.9%) of the total SC population in Kandhamal district. In Odisha, 14% of them have middle educational level, about 13% have more. 60.9% of their children in the 5–14 years group were at school. 16.8% of the Pano workers were cultivators, 54.3% agricultural labourers, 4.2% HHI workers and 24.7% other workers. 
16.89% of the total population of Kandhamal district are members of a scheduled caste. Most of them are Pano (77.92%).
Kendujhar district has 11.62% members of scheduled castes and among them the major caste groups are the Pano (58.77%). In 1891, those living in Sitra were called workers in metal, speaking Kui and Odia. Intermarriage to Khonds and Odias was not permitted.

Subdivision
Panos have several sub-castes: the Odia, who claim a higher social status than the others, Buna, who are weavers, Betra or Raj, basketmakers, bamboo workers, and also perform watchman duties, Baistab, Panos who are Vaishnavites and perform their religious ceremonies, and Patraida, Panos who live alongside the Khondhs. This last subset is often simply referred to as the Khonda Panos, while the others are collectively referred to as Desa Panos.

Colonial ethnographers, such as Herbert Hope Risley, theorized they were Dravidians who have been "Hinduized."

Culture 
The Panos have a group of totemistic exogamous clans, traced down the father's line. However, this system of exogamy only considers ancestors only a few generations back and in the area, and so only excludes those of the clan in the area. This system of exogamy is followed by tribals throughout central and eastern India and is dubbed "local lines" by anthropologists. However, within this system, Panos ban marriage between someone and their first cousins and paternal uncle.

Pano girls were only married when they became adults. The dowry provided near the turn of the 20th century was Rs. 2 cash, a mound and a half of husked rice, a goat and 2 saris: for the bride and for the mother-in-law. Widow remarriage is common and it is seen as correct for the bride to marry her husband's younger brother, but never the elder. Divorce is also recognized, and the divorced husband must provide for his wife for 6 months. Divorcees are allowed to remarry.

Religion 
At the turn of the 20th century, the Panos, although nominally Vaishnavites, were practicing animism similar to neighbouring Dravidian tribes. They held in the belief of certain village deities who were to be propitiated to induce fertility or stave off ruin, primarily via animal sacrifice. Their main deity was Pauri Pahari, the god who lived upon the highest of the local hills, and to him they would offer goat sacrifices. The Panos of southern Odisha maintain they were always animists like their Khond neighbours. Today, however, most the Panos are Catholics.

Recent status 
Due to their knowledge of Odia, the Panos often acted as intermediaries between the Khond hill-tribes and the Odia-speaking caste Hindu society. For instance in the Meriah human sacrifices formerly practiced by the Khonds, the Panos would always provide the victims. Occasionally they would kidnap people from the plains and sell them to the Khonds (during which British authorities alleged they cheated the Khonds). When the British began to crack down on practice of the Meriah, the Panos developed a closer relationship with the Christian missionaries who began arriving in the area. Thus they converted to Christianity and became more prosperous than their Khond counterparts who remained animists. This led to Khond accusations of their being "traitors" to their original faith. This enmity between the two communities was fanned by alleged favouritism by NGOs in helping the Christian Panos in times of distress, and Hindutva organisations, especially those led by Laxmananda Saraswati of the Vishwa Hindu Parishad, leading "reconversion" drives.

Due to a Presidential Order in 1950, Panos who converted to Christianity could no longer hold SC status. Pano organization Phulbani Kui Janakalyan Samiti, started in 2002, sought to give Panos Scheduled Tribe status due to their knowledge of Kui. This effort was opposed by the Khonds - the government soon denied Panos the ST status and hundreds of Pano government employees were fired for falsifying caste certificates. These tensions would culminate in the Kandhamal Riots, when, after the murder of Saraswati which was claimed to be done by Christians, mobs of tribals and non-tribals attacked Pano settlements and churches throughout Kandhamal. Many Panos were displaced and lost everything, and as of 2017 the situation between the two communities has not returned to normalcy.

Notes

References

Dalit communities
Scheduled Castes of West Bengal
Scheduled Castes of Bihar
Scheduled Castes of Jharkhand
Scheduled Castes of Odisha